Rebecca Maureen Burns (born 30 September 1994) is a New Zealand cricketer who currently plays for Wellington and New Zealand. She plays as a right-handed batter. She has previously played for Central Districts.

Early life
Burns was born on 30 September 1994 in Wellington.

Domestic career
Burns made her debut for Wellington on 10 December 2011, against Northern Districts in the Action Cricket Cup. Burns joined Central Districts ahead of the 2016–17 season, remaining at the club for two seasons before re-joining Wellington. In December 2018, Burns made her List A high score, with 72* in Wellington's 9 wicket victory over Northern Districts.

International career
In December 2022, Burns was called up into the New Zealand squad for their T20I series against Bangladesh as cover for the injured Brooke Halliday. She made her Twenty20 International debut in the second match of the series, in which she scored 20 from 19 deliveries.

References

External links
 
 

1994 births
Living people
Cricketers from Wellington City
New Zealand women cricketers
New Zealand women Twenty20 International cricketers
Wellington Blaze cricketers
Central Districts Hinds cricketers